Barbière Island is a small island, the southeasternmost of the islands lying off the south end of Petermann Island, in the Wilhelm Archipelago. It was charted by the French Antarctic Expedition, 1908–10, and named after M. Barbière, one of the port engineers at Recife, Pernambuco, who assisted the expedition in 1910.

See also 
 List of Antarctic and sub-Antarctic islands

References
 

Islands of the Wilhelm Archipelago